Jaroenthong Kiatbanchong (born: June 11, 1968 in Tambon Thung Yai, Amphoe Thung Yai, Nakhon Si Thammarat province, southern Thailand) is a retired Thai Muay Thai kickboxer. He is very popular and famous in the 80s and early 90s, which is considered a golden era of Muay Thai.

Biography & career
Jaroenthong (nicknamed: Ped; เป็ด; lit: "Duck") was born in a family of fighters in southern Thailand. His brothers are all Muay Thai fighters include Chalamthong  Kiatbanchong (older brother) and Samranthong Kiatbanchong (younger brother; died of a car accident in early 2008).

His first fight at the age of 12 years and gained 100 baht from love in Muay Thai. Later when he grew up, he came to Bangkok for study at the secondary level at Wimutayaram Pittayakorn School in Bang Phlat neighbourhood. He became a fighter at the camp "Kiatbanchong" which is owned by Chuchok "Mai Muangkhon" Chukaewruang, a fellow southerner.

He regularly fights at Lumpinee Stadium under famous promoter Songchai Rattanasuban's stable. He won three-weight championships of the Lumpinee Stadium include Junior bantamweight,  Featherweight and Lightweight. He faced many top-line fighters in that era, such as Namphon Nongkee Pahuyuth, Cherry Sor Wanich, Wangchannoi Sor Palangchai, Namkabuan Nongkee Pahuyuth, Superlek Sorn E-Sarn, Petdum Lukborai, Therdkiat Sittepitak, Samransak Muangsurin, Chamuakpetch Hapalang, Ratchasak Sor Vorapin,  Langsuang Panyupathum, Panumtuanlek Hapalang, André Masseur and the Dutch legendary Ramon Dekkers. His maximum gained is 250,000 baht in fight with Saencheng Pinsinchai.

In 1988, he was the most successful. He faced his favorite senior fighter, Samart Payakaroon who at that time was to lose the WBC Super bantamweight world title to the Australian boxer Jeff Fenech and back to Muay Thai again. In the fight to prove who the real top fighters of the era. As a result, he was knocked out just only the first round by Samart's fist. But that was the fight he was most proud of.

In addition, he also had an amateur boxing match and achieved some degree of success, include gold medal XXVI Thailand National Games in Surat Thani, bronze medal in the King's Cup. He also joined the national team to compete in the 1990 Asian Games in Beijing, China.

After retirement, he is a trainer and owns his own Muay Thai gym in the name "Jaroenthong Muay Thai School" in Wang Thonglang District, Bangkok.

In 2013, he returned to Muay Thai again at age 44, he competed in the 2013 Toyota Marathon Tournament in Kanchanaburi province. He won two times before losing to a young Iranian fighter Vahid Shahbazi in the finals.

Besides boxing, with a good-looking man and famous. He has been photographed in various magazines, including television dramas and movies. In 2010, he co-starred in the historical film Yamada: The Samurai of Ayothaya with many fellow fighters, Buakaw Por. Pramuk, Saenchai Sor. Kingstar, Yodsanklai Fairtex, Anuwat Kaewsamrit and Somjit Jongjohor.

Titles

Muay Thai
Lumpinee Stadium 
 1987 Lumpinee Stadium 115 lbs Champion
 1988 Lumpinee Stadium 126 lbs Champion
 1991 Lumpinee Stadium 126 lbs Champion
Sports Writers Association of Thailand
 1989 Fight of the Year (vs Cherry Sor.Wanich)
World Muaythai Council
 1990 WMTC 135 lbs Champion (2 defenses)
 1993 WMTC 140 lbs Champion

Amateur Boxing
Gold Medal XXVI Thailand National Games (1993)
Bronze Medal in the King's Cup

Fight record

|-  style="background:#fbb;"
| 2013-05-31 || Loss ||align=left| Vahid Shahbzai || Toyota Marathon, Final || Kanchanaburi, Thailand || Decision|| 3 ||3:00
|-  style="background:#cfc;"
| 2013-05-31 || Win ||align=left| Yukiya Nakamura|| Toyota Marathon, Semi Final || Kanchanaburi, Thailand || Decision|| 3 ||3:00

|-  style="background:#cfc;"
| 2000-09-09 || Win||align=left| Melchor Menor ||Warriors Cup of America || Irvine, California, United States|| Decision  || 5 || 3:00

|-  style="background:#fbb;"
| ? || Loss ||align=left| Theerapong Sit Korayuth || Lumpinee Stadium || Bangkok, Thailand || TKO (Punch) || 3 ||3:00

|-  style="background:#fbb;"
| 1994-03-14 || Loss ||align=left| Orono Por Muang Ubon || Rajadamnern Stadium || Bangkok, Thailand || Decision|| 5 ||3:00
|-  style="background:#fbb;"
| 1994-01-14 || Loss ||align=left| Superlek Sorn E-Sarn || Lumpinee Stadium || Bangkok, Thailand || Decision|| 5 ||3:00
|-  style="background:#cfc;"
| 1993-12-04 || Win||align=left| Ramon Dekkers || Royal Thai Navy Academy temporary stadium || Samut Prakan, Thailand || Decision (majority)  || 5 || 3:00 
|-
! style=background:white colspan=9 |
|-  style="background:#cfc;"
| 1993-06-11 || Win ||align=left| Petchdam Sor.Bodin || Lumpinee Stadium || Bangkok, Thailand || Decision|| 5 ||3:00
|-  style="background:#c5d2ea;"
| 1992-11-13 || NC||align=left| Chandet Sor Prantalay || Lumpinee Stadium || Bangkok, Thailand || no contest (Referee stop) ||  || 
|-
! style=background:white colspan=9 |
|-  style="background:#cfc;"
| 1992-10-23 || Win ||align=left| Chanchai Sor Tamarangsri ||  || Bangkok, Thailand || Decision || 5 || 3:00
|-  style="background:#fbb;"
| 1992-09-25 || Loss||align=left| Cherry Sor Wanich || Lumpinee Stadium || Bangkok, Thailand || Decision || 5 || 3:00
|-  style="background:#fbb;"
| 1992-04-17|| Loss ||align=left| Jongsanan Fairtex || Lumpinee Stadium || Bangkok, Thailand || Decision || 5 || 3:00 
|-  style="background:#cfc;"
| 1992-02-28 || Win ||align=left| Sanit Wichitkriankgrai ||  || Samut Prakan, Thailand || Decision || 5 || 3:00

|-  style="background:#cfc;"
| 1991-11-03 || Win||align=left| Superlek Chor.Sawat || Onesongchai || New Zealand || Decision|| 5 || 3:00

|-  style="background:#fbb;"
| 1991-08-14 || Loss ||align=left| Namphon Nongkee Pahuyuth || Rajadamnern Stadium || Bangkok, Thailand || Decision || 5 || 3:00
|-  style="background:#fbb;"
| 1991-07-02|| Loss ||align=left| Wangchannoi Sor Palangchai || Lumpinee Stadium || Bangkok, Thailand || Decision || 5 || 3:00
|-  style="background:#cfc;"
| 1991-06-14 || Win ||align=left| Therdkiat Sitthepitak || Lumpinee Stadium || Bangkok, Thailand || Decision || 5 || 3:00
|-
! style=background:white colspan=9 |
|- style="background:#fbb;"
| 1991-03-29 || Loss ||align=left| Namkabuan Nongkeepahuyuth  || Lumpinee Stadium || Bangkok, Thailand  || Decision || 5 || 3:00
|-  style="background:#fbb;"
| 1991-03-05 || Loss ||align=left| Nuathoranee Thongracha || Lumpinee Stadium || Bangkok, Thailand || Decision || 5 || 3:00
|- style="background:#fbb;"
| 1991-02-15 || Loss ||align=left| Namkabuan Nongkeepahuyuth  || Lumpinee Stadium || Bangkok, Thailand  || Decision|| 5 ||3:00
|-  style="background:#cfc;"
| 1991-01-30 ||Win||align=left| Rajasak Sor.Vorapin || Rajadamnern Stadium || Bangkok, Thailand || Decision||5  || 3:00
|-  style="background:#cfc;"
| 1991-01-04 ||Win||align=left| Panomrunglek Chor.Sawat || Lumpinee Stadium || Bangkok, Thailand || Decision||5  || 3:00

|-  style="background:#cfc;"
| 1990-12- || Win||align=left| Tommy Van Der Berg ||  || Netherlands || Decision  || 5 || 3:00 
|-
! style=background:white colspan=9 |

|-  style="background:#fbb;"
| 1990-11-27 || Loss||align=left| Therdkiat Sitthepitak || Lumpinee Stadium || Bangkok, Thailand || Decision || 5 || 3:00

|- style="background:#cfc;"
| 1990-10-07 || Win ||align=left| Superlek Sorn E-Sarn || OneSongchai ||  New Zealand  || Decision || 5 || 3:00
|-
! style=background:white colspan=9 |

|-  style="background:#cfc;"
| 1990-09-25 || Win||align=left| Rajasak Sor.Vorapin || Lumpinee Stadium || Bangkok, Thailand || Decision || 5 || 3:00

|-  style="background:#fbb;"
| 1990-08-15 || Loss||align=left| Rajasak Sor.Vorapin || Rajadamnern Stadium || Bangkok, Thailand || Decision || 5 || 3:00
|-  style="background:#fbb;"
| 1990-07-29 || Loss ||align=left| Cherry Sor Wanich ||  || Arizona, United States || Decision || 5 || 3:00
|-  style="background:#c5d2ea;"
| 1990-06-29 || Draw||align=left| Cherry Sor Wanich || Lumpinee Stadium || Bangkok, Thailand || Decision || 5 || 3:00
|-  style="background:#cfc;"
| 1990-06-08 || Win||align=left| Petchdam Lukborai || Lumpinee Stadium || Bangkok, Thailand || Decision || 5 || 3:00
|-  style="background:#cfc;"
| 1990-05-18 || Win ||align=left| Louis Bekker || MAJKF || Tokyo, Japan || Decision || 5 || 3:00
|-  style="background:#cfc;"
| 1990-04-24 || Win ||align=left| Therdkiat Sitthepitak ||  Lumpinee Stadium  || Bangkok, Thailand || Decision || 5 || 3:00
|-  style="background:#fbb;"
| 1990-03-06 || Loss ||align=left| Superlek Sorn E-Sarn || Lumpinee Stadium || Bangkok, Thailand || TKO|| 3 ||

|-  style="background:#fbb;"
| 1990-02-06 || Loss ||align=left| Petchdam Lukborai || Lumpinee Stadium || Bangkok, Thailand || Decision || 5 || 3:00
|-
! style=background:white colspan=9 |
|-  style="background:#cfc;"
| 1990-01-19 || Win ||align=left| Petchdam Lukborai || Lumpinee Stadium || Bangkok, Thailand || Decision || 5 || 3:00
|-  style="background:#cfc;"
| 1989-12-31 || Win||align=left| Andre Masseur ||  || France|| KO (Left high kick)|| 3 ||
|-
! style=background:white colspan=9 |
|-  style="background:#cfc;"
| 1989-11-28 || Win ||align=left| Petchdam Lukborai || Lumpinee Stadium || Bangkok, Thailand || Decision || 5 || 3:00
|-  style="background:#fbb;"
| 1989-11-08 || Loss||align=left| Petchdam Lukborai || Lumpinee Stadium || Bangkok, Thailand || Decision || 5 || 3:00
|-
! style=background:white colspan=9 |
|-  style="background:#cfc;"
| 1989-10-23 || Win ||align=left| Sombat Sor.Thanikul ||  || Koh Samui, Thailand || KO  || 4 ||
|-  style="background:#fbb;"
| 1989-10-06 || Loss ||align=left| Namphon Nongkee Pahuyuth|| Lumpinee Stadium || Bangkok, Thailand || Decision|| 5 || 3:00 
|-
! style=background:white colspan=9 |
|-  style="background:#fbb;"
| 1989-08-29 || Loss ||align=left| Saencherng Pinsinchai || Lumpinee Stadium|| Bangkok, Thailand || Decision || 5 || 3:00
|-  style="background:#cfc;"
| 1989-08-15 || Win ||align=left| Cherry Sor Wanich || Lumpinee Stadium || Bangkok, Thailand || Decision || 5 || 3:00
|-  style="background:#cfc;"
| 1989-07-25 || Win ||align=left| Noppadet Sor.Rewadee || Lumpinee Stadium || Bangkok, Thailand || Decision || 5 || 3:00

|-  style="background:#fbb;"
| 1989-06-03 || Loss ||align=left| Manasak Sor Ploenchit||  || Trang Province, Thailand || TKO || 3 ||
|-  style="background:#cfc;"
| 1989-05-02 || Win ||align=left| Petchdam Lukborai || Lumpinee Stadium || Bangkok, Thailand || Decision || 5 || 3:00
|-  style="background:#cfc;"
| 1989-04-07 || Win ||align=left| Namphon Nongkee Pahuyuth|| Lumpinee Stadium || Bangkok, Thailand || TKO || 3 ||
|-  style="background:#cfc;"
| ? || Win||align=left| Bobby Beckles || MA Japan Kickboxing Federation || Tokyo, Japan || KO || 2 || 2:22
|-  style="background:#fbb;"
| 1989-03-10 || Loss||align=left| Namphon Nongkee Pahuyuth|| Lumpinee Stadium || Bangkok, Thailand || Decision|| 5 || 3:00 
|-
! style=background:white colspan=9 |
|-  style="background:#fbb;"
| 1989-01-06 || Loss||align=left| Samart Payakaroon || Lumpinee Stadium || Bangkok, Thailand || KO (Right hook) || 1 ||
|-  style="background:#cfc;"
| 1988-11-25|| Win ||align=left| Samransak Muangsurin || Lumpinee Stadium || Bangkok, Thailand || Decision || 5 || 3:00 
|-
! style=background:white colspan=9 |
|-  style="background:#fbb;"
| 1988-10-11 || Loss ||align=left| Samransak Muangsurin || Lumpinee Stadium || Bangkok, Thailand || Decision || 5 || 3:00
|-  style="background:#cfc;"
| 1988-08-30 || Win ||align=left| Panomtuanlek Hapalang || Lumpinee Stadium || Bangkok, Thailand || Decision || 5 || 3:00
|-  style="background:#cfc;"
| 1988-07-18|| Win ||align=left| Chamuekpet Hapalang || Rajadamnern Stadium || Bangkok, Thailand || Decision || 5 || 3:00
|-  style="background:#cfc;"
| 1988-06-10 || Win ||align=left| Langsuan Panyuthaphum || Lumpinee Stadium || Bangkok, Thailand || Decision || 5 || 3:00

|-  style="background:#fbb;"
| 1988-05-17 || Loss||align=left| Yodpetch Sor.Jttpattana|| Lumpinee Stadium || Bangkok, Thailand || Decision || 5 || 3:00

|-  style="background:#cfc;"
| 1988-04-08 || Win ||align=left| Mono Singkaosen ||  || Hat Yai, Thailand || Decision || 5 || 3:00
|-  style="background:#cfc;"
| 1988-03-31 || Win ||align=left| Panrit Looksriraj || Rajadamnern Stadium || Bangkok, Thailand || Decision|| 5 ||3:00
|-  style="background:#fbb;"
| 1988-02-24 || Loss||align=left| Panrit Looksriraj || Rajadamnern Stadium || Bangkok, Thailand || Decision|| 5 ||3:00
|-  style="background:#fbb;"
| 1988-01-26 || Loss||align=left| Wisanupon Saksamut || Lumpinee Stadium || Bangkok, Thailand || Decision || 5 || 3:00
|-
! style=background:white colspan=9 |
|-  style="background:#cfc;"
| 1987-12-29 || Win ||align=left| Phayanoi Sor.Tasanee || Lumpinee Stadium || Bangkok, Thailand || Decision ||5  ||3:00
|-
! style=background:white colspan=9 |
|-  style="background:#cfc;"
| 1987-10-19 || Win||align=left| Paruhatlek Sitchunthong || Lumpinee Stadium || Bangkok, Thailand || Decision || 5 || 3:00

|-  style="background:#cfc;"
| 1987-08-28 || Win||align=left| Dennua Denmolee ||  || Bangkok, Thailand || Decision || 5 || 3:00

|-  style="background:#fbb;"
| 1987-07-24 || Loss||align=left| Wangchannoi Sor Palangchai ||  || Bangkok, Thailand || KO || 2 ||

|-  style="background:#c5d2ea;"
| 1987-06-17 || Draw||align=left| Namphon Nongkee Pahuyuth || Lumpinee Stadium || Bangkok, Thailand ||  Decision || 5 || 3:00

|-  style="background:#fbb;"
| 1987-04-16 || Loss ||align=left| Yodpetch Sor.Jitpattana || Lumpinee Stadium || Bangkok, Thailand || Decision || 5 ||3:00

|-  style="background:#cfc;"
| 1987-03-26 || Win||align=left| Namphon Nongkee Pahuyuth || Lumpinee Stadium || Bangkok, Thailand ||  Decision || 5 || 3:00
|-
! style=background:white colspan=9 |
|-  style="background:#cfc;"
| 1987-02-11 || Win ||align=left| Khaopho Sit Chanyut || Lumpinee Stadium || Bangkok, Thailand || Decision || 5 ||3:00
|-  style="background:#;"
| 1986-09-22 || ||align=left| Phetsiam Kiatsingnoi || Rajadamnern Stadium || Bangkok, Thailand || ||  ||
|-  style="background:#cfc;"
| 1986-07-30|| Win||align=left| Dokmaipa Por Pongsawang || Lumpinee Stadium || Bangkok, Thailand || Decision || 5 || 3:00
|-  style="background:#cfc;"
| 1986-05-23 || Win ||align=left| Boonmee Sitsuchon || Lumpinee Stadium || Bangkok, Thailand || Decision || 5 || 3:00
|-  style="background:#fbb;"
| 1985-05-09 || Loss ||align=left| Niwet Sor Sawat || Lumpinee Stadium || Bangkok, Thailand || Decision || 5 || 3:00
|-  style="background:#fbb;"
| 1984-12-13 || Loss ||align=left| Petchkasem Yuthakit || Rajadamnern Stadium || Bangkok, Thailand || Decision || 5 || 3:00
|-
| colspan=9 | Legend:

References

External links
Jaroenthong Muay Thai School Official Facebook 

1968 births
Living people
Jaroenthong Kiatbanchong
Jaroenthong Kiatbanchong
Featherweight kickboxers
Lightweight kickboxers
Muay Thai trainers
Competitors at the 1990 Asian Games
Jaroenthong Kiatbanchong

th:เจริญทอง เกียรติบ้านช่อง